Tom Fast (born May 15, 1966) is an American attorney and politician serving as a member of the West Virginia House of Delegates from the 32nd district. Elected in November 2014, he assumed office in 2015

Early life and education 
Fast was born in Fairmont, West Virginia in 1966. He earned a Bachelor of Arts degree in political science from Regent University and a Juris Doctor from the Regent University School of Law.

Career 
From 1998 to 2006, Fast was chair of the Fayette County Republican Executive Committee. He was elected to the West Virginia House of Delegates in 2014 and assumed office in 2015. Since 2017, Fast has served as chair of the House Industry and Labor Committee. In the 2021–2022 legislative session, Fast is vice chair of the House Judiciary Committee. He previously served as co-chair of the House Jails and Prisons Committee. Fast also owns and operates the Fast Law Office L.C.

References 

1966 births
Living people
Lawyers from Fairmont, West Virginia
Regent University alumni
Regent University School of Law alumni
West Virginia lawyers
Republican Party members of the West Virginia House of Delegates
Politicians from Fairmont, West Virginia